May Lake or Lake May may refer to:

May Lake (California), a lake in Yosemite National Park
May Lake (Vancouver Island), a lake in British Columbia, Canada
Lake May (Minnesota), a lake in Cass County